was a Japanese film director, screenwriter and manga artist. He directed several pinku eiga erotic films, but his most notable feature was the 1995 crime thriller Gonin starring Takeshi Kitano.

Filmography

Manga works 
1975 Inka Jigoku
1977 Nami
1978 Tenshi no Harawata
1978 Akai Kyôshitsu
1979 Yokosuka Rock
1980 Illumination
1981 Python 357
1981 Onna no Machi
1982 Kuro no Tenshi
1982 Shôjo Nami
1984 Zôge no Akuma
1985 Ishii Takashi Jisen Gekigashuu
1987 Ai no Yukue
1987 Last Waltz
1987 Yoru ni Hôho Yose
1988 Akai Memai
1989 Ame Monogatari
1989 Tsuki Monogatari
1990 Maraque
1990 Akai Tôriame
1990 Akai Yoru
1991 Amai Yoru
1991 Yoru o Furuete
1993 Nami Returns
1998 Manjushaka
2000 Cantarella no Hako
2001 Nami in Blue

References

External links
 Takashi Ishii official fan site
 
 

1946 births
2022 deaths
Japanese film directors
Pink film directors
People from Sendai
Gekiga creators
Manga artists